Hans is a Germanic masculine given name in Danish, Dutch, Estonian, Faroese, German,  Norwegian, Icelandic and Swedish-speaking populations.  It was originally short for Johannes (John), but is now also recognized as a name in its own right for official purposes.  The earliest documented usage was in 1356 in Sweden, 1360 in Norway, and the 14th century in Denmark.

The name "Hansel" is a variant, meaning "little Hans".

Alternate forms
Other variants include: Han, Hawns, Hanns, Hannes, Hanse, Hansi (also female), Hansele, Hansal, Hensal, Hanserl, Hännschen, Hennes, Hännes, Hänneschen, Henning, Henner, Honsa, Johan, Johann, Jan, Jannes, Jo, Joha, Hanselmann, Hansje.

Pet, diminutive, alternative and other language forms are:
  (Dutch, German, Swedish, Icelandic, Finnish)
 Honza (Czech)
 Hovhannes ( (reformed);  (classical))
 Jack (English)
 Johnny/Johnnie (English)
 John (English)
 יוֹחָנָן, Yohanan or יְהוֹחָנָן Yehohanan (Hebrew)
 Yohanna the Arabic language derivative, used among Arabic-speaking Christians
 Yahya, used among Arab and non-Arab Muslims
 Evan,  (Welsh a pre-Christian Celtic subsequently equated to John)
 Jevan (variation of Evan)
  (Italian)
  (Maltese)
  (Norwegian, Swedish, Danish, Dutch, Polish, Czech, Slovak, German)
  (Slovak)
 , diminutives:  (Slovenian)
  (Hungarian); diminutives: 
  (Dutch, Swedish, Danish, Norwegian)
  (Aragonese)
  (Catalan)
  (French)
 , (medieval French), still in use, but rare
  (Breton)
  (Portuguese)
  (Galician)
  (Germanic: German, Danish, Norwegian, Swedish, Dutch)
  (variation of Johannes)
  (Icelandic)
  (Lithuanian)
  (Serbian)
  (Spanish and Filipino)
  (Finnish)
 Ants (Estonian)
  (Latvian)
 Ian (Scottish derived from Gaelic )
  (Romanian)
  (Bulgarian, Croatian, Russian and other Slavic languages)
 Sean (Irish , after the French )
 Shane (anglicized form of )
 Shaun (anglicised form of )
 Shawn (anglicised form of )
  (Welsh)
  (Kirundi)
 Yohanes (Eritrean)
  (Western Lombard)

Feminine forms are:
 Hansina
  (Norwegian)
 Ioana
 Jana
 Jane
  (Portuguese and Catalan)
  (French)
 Joanne
 Joan
 Johanna
  (Norwegian)
 Jean
 Janice, Janet, both shortened as "Jan"
 Non-English variants adopted as English names include Jeanette

Arts and entertainment

Authors
 Hans Christian Andersen (1805–1875), Danish author
 Hans Henning Atrott (1944–2018), German author and theorist
 Hans Einer (1856–1927), Estonian language teacher, author of schoolbooks and a cultural figure 
 Hans Fallada (1893–1947), German writer
 Hans Herbjørnsrud (born 1938), Norwegian author
 Hans Holzer (1920–2009), Austrian-American author and parapsychologist
 Hans Henny Jahnn (1894–1959), German playwright and novelist
 Hans Lorbeer (1901–1973), German politician and writer
 Hans Erich Nossack (1901–1977), German writer

Painters and sculptors
 Hans Coumans (1943–1986), Dutch painter
 Hans Rudolf Giger (1940–2014), Swiss painter, sculptor, and set designer
 Hans Holbein the Younger (1497–1543), German Renaissance portraitist
 Hans Seyffer (1460–1509), German sculptor

Other arts and entertainment
 Hans Albers (1891–1960), German singer and actor, stage name 
Hans Christensen (1924–1983), Danish-born American silversmith
 Hans Clarin (1929–2005), German actor
 Hans Conried (1917–1982), American comedian and actor
 Hans Kaldoja (1942–2017), Estonian actor
 Hans Klok (born 1969), Dutch magician
 Hans Matheson (born 1975), Scottish actor
 Hans Moser (actor) (1880–1964), Austrian actor born Jean Julier
 Hans Heinz Moser (1936–2017), Swiss actor
 Hans Werner Olm (born 1955), German cabaret performer and comic
 Hans Rosenthal (1925–1987), German entertainer and presenter, named 
 Hans Roosipuu (1931–2017), Estonian film director
 Hans H. Steinberg (born 1950), German actor
 Hans Söhnker (1903–1981), German actor
 Dolph Lundgren (born Hans Lundgren) (born 1957), Swedish actor and martial artist
 Hans Wegner (or Hans Jørgensen Wegner, 1914–2007), Danish furniture designer

Medicine
 Hans Asperger (1906–1980), Austrian pediatrician for whom Asperger syndrome is named
 Hans Berger (1873–1941), German neurologist

Military and paramilitary
 Hans Aumeier (1902–1945), German Nazi SS deputy commandant of Auschwitz concentration camp executed for war crimes
 Hans Berndtson (born 1945), Swedish Army lieutenant general
 Hans Bothmann (1911–1946), German Nazi SS concentration camp commandant
 Hans Hagnell (1919–2006), Swedish politician
 Hans Helwig (1881–1952), German Nazi SS concentration camp commandant
 Hans Horrevoets (1974–2006), Dutch sea sailor
 Hans Hüttig (1894–1980), German Nazi SS concentration camp commandant
 Hans Kalm (1889–1981), Estonian-born military officer
 Hans Krebs (SS general) (1888–1947), Moravian-born Nazi SS officer executed for war crimes
 Hans Loritz (1895–1946), German Nazi SS concentration camp commandant
 Hans von Luck (1911–1997), German officer
 Hans Möser (1906–1948), German Nazi SS concentration camp officer executed for war crimes
 Hans Osara (c. 1560–1601), Finnish lieutenant in the Cudgel War
 Hans Oster (1887–1945), German brigadier general and deputy head of military intelligence
 Hans Simonsson (1880–1965), Swedish Navy vice admiral

Music
 Hans Guido von Bülow (1830–1894), German pianist and conductor
 Hans Gruber (conductor) (1925–2001), Canadian conductor
 Hans Hartz (1943–2002), German singer 
 Hans Werner Henze (1926–2012), German composer
 Hans Söllner (born 1955), German singer-songwriter
 Hans Zimmer (born 1957), German film composer
 Hans Poulsen (1945–2023), Australian songwriter/musician

Politics
 Hans Apel (1932–2011), German politician 
 Hans Bentzien (1927–2015), East German writer and politician 
 Hans Blix (born 1928), Swedish diplomat and politician
 Hans, Count von Bülow (1774–1825), Prussian statesman
 Hans Eichel (born 1941), German politician 
 Hans Ekström (born 1958), Swedish politician
 Hans Filbinger (1913–2007), German politician 
 Hans Frank (1900–1946), German Nazi lawyer and governor general of Nazi-occupied Poland executed for war crimes
 Hans Friderichs (born 1931), German politician and businessman
 Hans Dietrich Genscher (1927–2016), German politician
 Hans Gualthérie van Weezel (born 1941), Dutch politician and diplomat
 Hans Gustafsson (1923–1998), Swedish politician
 Hans Hamilton (1758–1822), Anglo-Irish politician
 Hans Koschnick (1929–2016), German politician 
 Hans Kruus (1891–1976), Estonian historian, academic and politician
 Hans Rebane (1882–1961), Estonian politician, diplomat and journalist
 Hans Reingruber (1888–1964) was a German academic and transport minister of East Germany
 Hans Unander (born 1970), Swedish politician
 Hans Vijlbrief (born 1963), Dutch state secretary
 Hans-Jochen Vogel (1926–2020), German politician 
 Hans Wiegel (born 1941), Dutch politician

Science
 Hans Albert Einstein (1904–1973), Swiss-American professor of hydraulic engineering, son of Albert Einstein
 Hans Ankum (1930–2019), Dutch legal scholar
 Hans Avé Lallemant (1938–2016), Dutch-born American geologist
 Hans Bethe (1906–2005), German-American nuclear physicist, Nobel laureate
 Hans Bos (born 1950), Dutch biochemist and cancer researcher
 Hans Capel (born 1936), Dutch physicist
 Hans Cohen (1923–2020), Dutch microbiologist
 Hans Christian Ørsted (1777–1851), Danish physicist and chemist who discovered that electric currents create magnetic fields
 Hans Freeman (1929–2008), German-born Australian protein crystallographer who elucidated the structure of plastocyanin
 Hans Geiger (1882–1945), German physicist, inventor of the Geiger counter
 Hans Hass (1919–2013), Austrian diver, naturalist and film-maker
 Hans Adolf Krebs (1900–1981), German born, British physician and biochemist. Identified citric acid cycle
 Hans Küng (1928–2021), Swiss Catholic theologian and author 
 Hans Lauda (1896–1974), Austrian industrialist
 Hans Lowey, Austrian-American chemist
 Hans Steffen (1865–1937), German geographer and explorer of Patagonia
 Hans Trass (1928–2017), Estonian ecologist and botanist

Sports
 Hans Christensen (footballer) (1906–1992), Danish footballer
 Hans Dersch (born 1967), American breaststroke swimmer
 Hans Eller  (1910–1943), German rower
 Hans Erkens (born 1952), Dutch footballer
 Harold Goldsmith, born Hans Goldschmidt (1930–2004), American Olympic foil and épée fencer
 Hans Halberstadt (1885–1966), German-born American Olympic fencer
 Hans Knecht (1913–1996), Swiss road racing cyclist
 Hans Krankl (born 1953), Austrian football player and trainer
 Hans Lutz (born 1949), German track and road cyclist
 Hans Maier (1916–2018), Dutch Olympic water polo player
 Hans Maier (rower) (1909–1943), German Olympic rower
 Hans Nüsslein (1910–1991), German tennis player
 Hans Parrel (born 1944), Dutch water polo player
 Hans Podlipnik-Castillo (born 1988), Chilean tennis player
 Hans Sarpei (born 1976), Ghanaian soccer player
 Hans Stolfus (born 1976), American beach volleyball player
 Hans von Tschammer und Osten (1887–1943), German sports director
 Hans Wouda (born 1941), Dutch water polo player

Other fields
 Hans Werner Aufrecht (born 1936), German automotive engineer, one of the founders of AMG Engine Production and Development
 Hans Benno Bernoulli (1876–1959), Swiss architect
 Hans Biebow (1902–1947), German chief of Nazi administration of the  Ghetto, executed for war crimes
 Hans Claessen (1563–1624), Dutch founder of the New Netherland Company
 Hans von Dohnanyi (1902–1945), German jurist and resistance fighter
 Hans Mayer (1907–2001), German literary scholar
 Hannes Meyer (or Hans Emil Meyer, 1889–1954) Swiss architect and second director of the Bauhaus
 Hans Niemann (born 2003), American chess player
 Hans Scholl (1918–1943), German resistance fighter
 Hans Wittwer (1894–1952), Swiss architect and Bauhaus teacher

Fictional characters
 Hans, a henchman of James Bond's opponent in You Only Live Twice
 Hans, a German enemy character in the fighting game Human Killing Machine
 Hans Castorp, main character in The Magic Mountain
 Hans, a supporting character in SpongeBob SquarePants
 Hans Guck-in-die-Luft, a character from one of the poems in Struwwelpeter
 Hans Moleman, from The Simpsons
 Hans Geering, in the BBC sitcom 'Allo 'Allo!
 Hans Gruber, antagonist from Die Hard
 Hans, Disney character and the main antagonist of Frozen
 Hans, one of the main characters from the 1990s animated movie The Nutcracker Prince
 Hans Zarkov, protagonist from Flash Gordon
 Hans Gudegast, the name given to the mountain climber in Cliff Hangers, a pricing game on the U.S. television game show The Price Is Right
 Hans Landa, from Inglourious Basterds
 Hans Volter, the main antagonist from the video game Killing Floor 2
 Super Hans, in the British TV comedy Peep Show
 Hans and Franz, recurring sketch characters on Saturday Night Live
 Sgt Hans Schultz, in the situational comedy Hogan's Heroes, portrayed by John Banner
 Hans Axgil, from the novel The Danish Girl, played by Matthias Schoenaerts in the 2015 film of the same name
 Hans Hubermann, the foster father of Liesel Meminger from the novel The Book Thief
 Hans, in Jules Verne's novel Journey to the Center of the Earth
 Hanschen Rilow, from the musical Spring Awakening
 Hans Zoë (also translated as Hange Zoë or Hanji Zoë), from the manga series Attack on Titan

See also
 Hans-Jörg Butt (born 1974), German footballer
 Hans-Christian Hausenberg (born 1998), Estonian decathlete and long jumper
 Hans-Hermann Hoppe (born 1949), libertarian writer and theorist
 Hans-Ulrich Indermaur (born 1939), Swiss television moderator, reporter, and writer
 Hans-Joachim Kulenkampff (1921–1998), German actor and presenter
 Hans-Joachim Marseille (1919–1942) German captain and fighter pilot, flying ace during the World War II
 Hans-Ulrich Rudel (1916–1982), German ground-attack pilot, the most decorated German serviceman in World War II
 Hanns, a given name
 Ethan Hanns, Samoan footballer
 Hansen (surname)
 Hanson (surname)

References

External links
Hans on BehindTheName.com

Faroese masculine given names
Danish masculine given names
Dutch masculine given names
Estonian masculine given names
German masculine given names
Norwegian masculine given names
Scandinavian masculine given names
Swedish masculine given names
Masculine given names